Pierre van Moerbeke (born 1 October 1944 in Leuven, Belgium) is a Belgian mathematician. He studied mathematics at the Catholic University of Leuven, where he received his degree in 1966. He then obtained a PhD in mathematics at Rockefeller University, New York City (1972). He is a professor of mathematics at Brandeis University (United States) and the UCL. He studies non-linear differential equations and partial differential equations, with soliton behavior. In 1988, he was awarded the Francqui Prize on Exact Sciences.

See also
Kac-van Moerbeke lattice

External links
 Official Webpage
 Alternate webpage

Van Moerbeke, Pierre
Van Moerbeke, Pierre
Van Moerbeke, Pierre
Van Moerbeke, Pierre
Van Moerbeke, Pierre